CS Universitatea Craiova is a football club which currently plays in Liga I in Romania.

Total statistics

Statistics by country

Statistics by competition 

Notes for the abbreviations in the tables below:

 1R: First round
 2R: Second round
 3R: Third round
 QF: Quarter-finals
 SF: Semi-finals
 1Q: First qualifying round
 2Q: Second qualifying round
 3Q: Third qualifying round
 PO: Play-off round

UEFA Champions League / European Cup

UEFA Cup Winners' Cup / European Cup Winners' Cup

UEFA Europa League / UEFA Cup

UEFA Europa Conference League

External links

Romanian football clubs in international competitions
European football